The Swedish Infantry Combat School (InfSS) was a combat arms school of the Swedish Army which operated in various forms from 1874 to 1995. The school was located at Kvarns bruk north of Borensberg.

History
The Swedish Infantry Combat School (Infanteriets stridsskola, InfSS) originated from the Swedish Infantry Gunnery School (Infanteriskjutskolan, SS) which was formed in 1878 in Stockholm. Although it was the school's official name, it also came to be called the Shooting School for the Infantry and the Cavalry (Skjutskolan för infanteriet och kavalleriet). On 1 October 1942, the school was reorganized into the Swedish Infantry Combat School. On 1 June 1953 the Swedish Army ABC-Defence School was added as a training school within the Swedish Infantry Combat School. On 1 February 1961, the school was organizationally transferred to Svea Life Guards (I 1). On 1 October 1961, the school adopted the name Infanteriets stridsskola (InfSS), when the school was relocated to Linköping. On 1 April 1963 the Infantry Officer School (Infanteriofficersskolan, IOS) and the Cavalry Officer School (Kavalleriofficerskolan, KOS) was amalgamated and came to be a part of the course of the Swedish Infantry Combat School.

Since the school constituted an independent unit of organization within the Swedish defense, it came on 1 July 1991 to organizationally be part of the Swedish Army's Infantry and Cavalry Center (Arméns infanteri- och kavallericentrum, InfKavC). The Swedish Infantry Combat School was one of three combat arms schools within the Swedish Army's Infantry and Cavalry Center. The other two schools were the Swedish Infantry Officers' College in Linköping Garrison and the Swedish Infantry and Cavalry Combat School (Infanteriets och kavalleriets stridsskola, Inf/KavSS) in Umeå Garrison.

On 30 June 1995, the three combat arms centers Swedish Army's Infantry and Cavalry Center and the Swedish Army Armoured Center, were disbanded in order to form a joint combat arms center on 1 July 1995; the Swedish Army Brigade Center (Arméns brigadcentrum, BrigC). Through this reorganization, on 1 July 1995 three new joint army schools were formed, Combat School North (Stridsskola Nord, SSN), Combat School Middle (Stridsskola Mitt, SSM) and Combat School South (Stridsskola Syd, SSS). There the Swedish Infantry Combat School with the Swedish Infantry Officers' College formed the Combat School Middle.

Location and training areas
When the Swedish Infantry Gunnery School was organized in 1878, it came to be placed at Rosersberg Palace. At Rosersberg, the school was located until 1961. When the school was relocated temporarily to Linköping Garrison on 19 May 1961, a ceremony was held at Rosersberg, and on 1 July 1961 the area was handed over to the Swedish Civil Defence Board. From 1 September 1961, the school officially operated in Linköping, where it was co-located with the Life Grenadier Regiment (I 4) and located to barracks 2. On 15 May 1963, parts of the school were moved to Kvarns bruk, where the whole school was located in 1966. The facility in Kvarns bruk was taken over by the Combat School Middle.

Heraldry and traditions

Coat of arms
The coat of the arms of the Swedish Infantry Combat School (Infanteriets stridsskola, InfSS) 1982–1991. Blazon: "Azure, two muskets in saltire between two letters of S, inside an open chaplet of laurels, all or".

Commanding officers

????–????: ?
1902–1906: Wilhelm Bergenstråhle
1906–1908: Hjalmar Gardtman
1908–1912: Olof Melin
1913–1915: Peter Hegardt
1915–1918: Gustaf Ros
1918–1921: Tage af Klercker
1921–1926: Rikard Salwén
1926–1931: Hugo Cederschiöld
1931–1934: ?
1934–1937: Nils Stenbeck 
1937–1938: Ivar Lindquist
1938–1941: ?
1941–1942: Magnus Hedenlund
1942–1943: Sven Ramström
1943–1946: ?
1946–1951: Regner Leuhusen
1951–1954: Wilhelm Reuterswärd
1954–1959: Bengt Uller
1959–1963: Sven Widegren
1964–1968: Åke Hultin
1968–1970: Iwan Hörnquist
1970–1974: Lennart Tollerz
1974–1977: Åke von Schéele
1977–1981: Leif Kesselmark
1981–1987: Torbjörn Tillman
1987–1989: Thor-Lennart Loo
1989–1991: Einar Jonasson
1991–1993: Kim Åkerman
1993–1995: Georg Aminoff

Names, designations and locations

Footnotes

References

Notes

Print

Web

Further reading

Military education and training in Sweden
Defunct schools in Sweden
Educational institutions established in 1874
Educational institutions disestablished in 1995
1874 establishments in Sweden
1995 disestablishments in Sweden
Stockholm Garrison
Linköping Garrison